The Bulgarian Democratic Party for European and World States (Българска демократическа партия за европейски и световни щати) is a political party in Bulgaria, led by Ivan Shabanov. The party was founded in 1990. In the 2001 Bulgarian parliamentary election the party got 4,804 votes (0.11%).

References

Political parties in Bulgaria
Political parties established in 1990